Kings of Metal is the sixth album by the American heavy metal band Manowar, released on November 18, 1988 by Atlantic Records. The album was the last to feature guitarist and founding member Ross "The Boss" Friedman, who later went on to rejoin punk band The Dictators. Drummer Scott Columbus left the band after this album as well, but rejoined for 1996's Louder Than Hell and remained with the band until 2008.

In 2017, Loudwire ranked it as the 13th best power metal album of all time.

Track listing
All songs written by Joey DeMaio except where noted.

Personnel
 Manowar
Eric Adams − vocals
Ross the Boss − guitars
Joey DeMaio − bass
Scott Columbus − drums

 Additional musicians
 Canoldir Male Choir directed by Clive Griffiths
 Arthur Whilshire – voices on track 9
 Grant Williams – voices on track 9

 Production
Richard Breen – engineer, mixing, Synclavier programming
Elvis T. Gruber – assistant engineer
Vince Gutman – digital programming, recording and mixing supervision
Howie Weinberg – mastering at Masterdisk, New York
Jason Flom – executive producer

Charts

Certifications

References

External links 
 Official artist website

1988 albums
Manowar albums
Albums with cover art by Ken Kelly (artist)
Atlantic Records albums